The Symphony No. 25 in G minor, K. 183/173dB, was written by the then 17-year-old Wolfgang Amadeus Mozart in October 1773, shortly after the success of his opera seria Lucio Silla. It was supposedly completed in Salzburg on October 5, a mere two days after the completion of his Symphony No. 24, although this remains unsubstantiated. Its first movement was used as the opening music in Miloš Forman's film biographical Amadeus.

This is one of two symphonies Mozart composed in G minor, sometimes referred to as the "little G minor symphony". The other is the Symphony No. 40; see also Mozart and G minor.

Movements 

The symphony is laid out in standard classical form:

Allegro con brio,  in G minor
Andante,  in E-flat major
Menuetto & Trio,  in G minor, Trio in G major
Allegro,  in G minor

This symphony is scored for two oboes, two bassoons, four horns and strings.

First movement

Second movement

Third movement

Fourth movement

Style and influence 
With its wide-leap melodic lines and syncopation, this symphony is characteristic of the  style. It shares certain features with other Sturm and Drang symphonies of this time, and is likely inspired by Haydn's Symphony No. 39, also in G minor.

Performance history 

The work was first performed in the United States by the Boston Symphony Orchestra on October 27, 1899, under the direction of Wilhelm Gericke. It was not performed again in the US until 1937, when rendered by the Alfred Wallenstein Sinfonietta. John Barbirolli and the New York Philharmonic performed it again in 1941 as part of their centennial season.

Notes

External links 

 (the Allegro con brio movement)
 (the Andante movement)
 Symphony No. 25 in G minor mp3 by the RIAS-Symphonie-Orchester Berlin (1950 recording), 
 , Weinberger Chamber Orchestra, Gábor Takács-Nagy, live concert, Tonhalle, Zürich, 31 January 2016

25
1773 compositions
Compositions in G minor